Shakti Singh (born 9 October 1955) is an Indian television and voice actor specializing in dubbing foreign films, mostly Hollywood films, in Hindi. He also works in dubbing for Hindi films.

Filmography

Live action films

Television Shows

Dubbing career
Singh had a well-known career in dubbing foreign films, most coming from Hollywood. He has voiced over a total of more than 50 films. When performing as a protagonist's voice or an antagonist's voice, Indian consumers often recognize him just by his voice. However, he is uncredited for Hindi-dubbed foreign movies due to the high cost of modifying theatrical releases. He has dubbed several actors such as Anthony Hopkins and Mel Gibson for English-language films.

Animated films and series

Dubbing roles

Live action television series

Live action films

Indian films

Foreign language films

Animated films (English)

Animated series

See also
 List of Indian dubbing artists
 Dubbing (filmmaking)

References

External links
 

1955 births
Living people
Actors from Mumbai
Indian male television actors
Indian male voice actors
Male actors in Hindi cinema